Nurhilmi Jasni (born 17 December 1986) is a Singaporean professional footballer who currently plays for Hougang United in the S.League. He plays as a midfielder.

Career
Nurhilmi Jasni played in the S.League for Tampines Rovers, Balestier Khalsa and currently Hougang United. The highlight of his career came in April 2013, in which he scored a brace to help the Cheetahs to a victory over Harimau Muda B.

References

External links

1986 births
Living people
Singaporean footballers
Association football midfielders
Tampines Rovers FC players
Balestier Khalsa FC players
Hougang United FC players
Singapore Premier League players